Ras Prince Monolulu (26 October 1881 – 14 February 1965), whose real name was Peter Carl Mackay (or McKay), was a horse-racing tipster, and something of an institution on the British racing scene from the 1920s until the time of his death. He was particularly noticeable for his brightly coloured clothing; as a tipster, one of his best known phrases was the cry "I gotta horse!", which was subsequently the title of his memoirs.

Family background and early life
Monolulu claimed to be a chief of the Falasha tribe of Abyssinia, but in reality he was born in St Croix, Danish West Indies (now part of the United States Virgin Islands). His baptism (as Peter Carl McKay) is noted in the records of the English Episcopal Church of the Danish West Indies. His father, whose name is not shown in the register, was William Henry McKay and his mother was Catherine Heyliger. His father and brothers were horse breeders, raisers and racers on St Croix.

According to his own account, he made his way from his birthplace to the African coast, where he was shanghaied on board a British ship: he styled himself a prince in the hope of receiving better treatment. His ship was subsequently shipwrecked on the Portuguese coast, from whence he made his way to New York. More plausibly he travelled to New York via Puerto Rico. He had various jobs, on shore and at sea, and eventually reached London in 1902.

Career as tipster
Monolulu first went to The Derby in 1903, and soon began to establish himself as a tipster. He adopted colourful robes, a plumed headdress, and the slogan "I've gotta horse!", sometimes alternating with "Black man for luck!". However, he also continued to travel around Britain, and around Europe, for example visiting Saint Petersburg with an American "negro show". He was in Königsberg when World War I broke out, and was held in Ruhleben internment camp, near Berlin, for the duration of the war. He returned to London in 1919.

Great Yarmouth resident Maud Swallow remembered Prince Monolulu at Great Yarmouth Racecourse. "I thought I was placing a bet on a horse but my father told me afterwards that I had actually bought a tip from Monolulu instead of placing a bet".

Monolulu rose to prominence after picking out the horse Spion Kop in the 1920 Derby, which came in at the long odds of 100–6, and from which he personally made some £ 8,000, a vast amount of money at the time, equivalent to £ 400,000 in 2020.

Personal life
Monolulu claimed to have been married six times, though only five marriages are documented at all, and reliable evidence exists for only three. He claimed to have been married first in a Jewish ceremony in Moscow in 1902, to a girl who was afterwards taken away by the police; and second in a Catholic ceremony in 1903 to a German girl who was killed in a car accident. More certain were his marriages to another German, Elizabeth Arnold, who accompanied him to England and whom he married in 1908, but who died in 1911; to Rhoda Carley in 1922, the marriage being dissolved in 1929; and finally to Nellie Adkins in 1931, a marriage which also broke down. In the 1950s he was romantically linked to an Austrian governess in London.

Death
The biography of Jeffrey Bernard by Graham Lord relates Prince Monolulu's death in some detail. It describes how Bernard at the time was working as a horse-racing journalist and visited Monolulu in the Middlesex Hospital to interview him. Bernard had brought with him a box of Black Magic chocolates and offered Monolulu a "strawberry cream". Monolulu subsequently choked to death on it and Bernard bade him farewell.

Media appearances
Monolulu frequently featured in newsreel broadcasts, and as a consequence was probably the best-known black man in Britain of the time.

He appeared in a clip in the 1939 propaganda film by Alexander Korda, The Lion has Wings (1939 film), Korda used him as an example of what Britain was, a nation at play and at ease with herself.

He appeared briefly in the 1952 film Derby Day, which is set around The Derby, the 1954 film Aunt Clara with Margaret Rutherford and Sid James, and also in the 1959 film Make Mine a Million.

In 1957 Monolulu appeared on the March 28th and April 4th episodes of Groucho Marx's quiz show You Bet Your Life.

Monolulu's name is referenced by the character Rigsby in the 1974 pilot episode of the UK comedy series Rising Damp, in humorous comparison to the new tenant Philip, who had stated he was the son of a chief.

References

Bibliography

External links
 
 Images at Science and Society website
 Newmarket memories of racing tipster Prince Monolulu BBC feature inc. photo gallery and audio sample Feb 2010
 The Ras Prince Monolulu Quandary BBC Radio 4 17 December 2016

1881 births
1965 deaths
British people of West Indian descent
Horse racing in Great Britain
People from Saint Croix, U.S. Virgin Islands
World War I civilian detainees held by Germany
Emigrants from the Danish West Indies to the United Kingdom